Sione Kite (born 14 January 1988), also known as John Kite is an Australian rugby league footballer for the Thirlmere Roosters in the Group 6 Rugby League. He previously played for the Canterbury-Bankstown Bulldogs and Melbourne Storm in the National Rugby League and the Widnes Vikings in the Super League.

Playing career
Born in Canterbury, New South Wales, Kite played his junior football for the St. John Eagles and St. George before being signed by the Canterbury-Bankstown Bulldogs. He played for the Bulldogs' Toyota Cup team in 2008, scoring 3 tries in 15 games. In Round 17 of the 2008 NRL season he made his NRL début for the Bulldogs against the South Sydney Rabbitohs.

At the end of the 2009 season, Kite signed with the Melbourne Storm. He made his début for the Storm in Round 21 of the 2010 NRL season.

On 26 January 2012, Kite signed a 1-year contract with the Widnes Vikings in the Super League. He made his début for the Vikings in Round 6 of the 2012 Super League season.

Representative career
In 2008, Kite was named in the Tonga training squad for the 2008 Rugby League World Cup but did not make the final squad.

Personal life
Kite is believed to be the biggest baby born at Canterbury hospital, weighing in at 15 pounds. He completed his schooling at Hampden Park Public School, followed by Holy Spirit College.

References

External links
2012 Widnes Vikings profile
Canterbury-Bankstown Bulldogs profile

1988 births
Living people
Australian rugby league players
Australian sportspeople of Tongan descent
Australian expatriate sportspeople in England
Melbourne Storm players
Canterbury-Bankstown Bulldogs players
Rugby league props
Rugby league second-rows
Rugby league players from Sydney
Widnes Vikings players